Ana Maria Josepa Dorotea Egual i Miguel (Castellón, January 1655 - Valencia, 23 April 1735), daughter of José Egual Borrás and Basilia Miguel, was a Spanish poet and dramatist. In 1676, she married Chrysostom Peris, Marquess of Castellfort, and moved to Valencia, where she convened literary academies. At the time of her death, almost all her work was destroyed, but some plays and various poems were saved.

Biography
Maria Egual spent her youth in Castellón and married Chrysostom Peris (first Marquis of Xínquer, and then of Castellfort). She held a literary academy in her home in Valencia. She wrote poetry, plays and narratives before her death. Her work was destroyed at the time of her death, although three volumes were conserved. Her literature is of a late Baroque style. She cultivated several poetic models, such as the paradramàtics colloquis.

Selected works 
 El esclavo de su dama.
 Los triunfos de Tesalia.
 Triunfos de amor en el aire.

References

Bibliography 
 María Egual, Poesías de la marquesa doña María Egual y Miguel, marquesa de Castellfort.
 Pasqual Mas y Javier Vellón (1997), La literatura barroca en Castellón. María Egual. Obra Completa. Sociedad Castellonense de Cultura.

1735 deaths
1655 births
17th-century Spanish poets
18th-century Spanish poets
Spanish women poets
People from Castellón de la Plana
18th-century Spanish women writers
Spanish women dramatists and playwrights